The following is a list of Sites of Special Scientific Interest in the Orkney Area of Search. For other areas, see List of SSSIs by Area of Search.

 Auskerry
 Bay of Skaill
 Calf of Eday
 Central Sanday, Sanday
 Copinsay
 Cruaday Quarry, Mainland
 Den Wick, Mainland
 Doomy and Whitemaw Hill, Eday
 East Sanday Coast, Sanday
 Eynhallow
 Faray and Holm of Faray
 Glims Moss and Durkadale, Mainland
 Holm of Papa Westray
 Hoy
 Keelylang Hill and Swartabeck Burn, Mainland
 Loch of Banks, Mainland
 Loch of Isbister and The Loons, Mainland
 Lochs of Harray and Stenness, Mainland
 Marwick Head, Mainland
 Mill Bay, Stronsay
 Mill Loch, Eday
 Muckle and Little Green Holm (Muckle Green Holm & Little Green Holm)
 Muckle Head and Selwick, Hoy
 North Hill, Papa Westray
 Northwall, Sanday
 Orphir and Stenness Hills, Mainland
 Pentland Firth Islands (Swona and Muckle Skerry)
 Rousay
 Stromness Heaths and Coast, Mainland
 Sule Skerry
 Sule Stack
 Switha
 Ward Hill Cliffs, South Ronaldsay
 Waulkmill
 West Mainland Moorlands, Mainland
 West Westray, Westray

References
 Orkney Islands Council Sites of Special Scientific Interest (SSSI)

 
Orkney
SSI